Lary 7, aka. L7 is an American artist, sound-artist, musician and filmmaker, based in New York City. He is subject of a documentary by filmmaker Danielle de Picciotto called Not Junk Yet - The Art Of Lary 7. The film includes interviews with Tony Conrad, Jarboe, Lydia Lunch, Jimi Tenor, Matthew Barney, JG Thirlwell and others including Lary, along with archival footage, images and performances. De Picciotto directed the film herself, with sound production by her husband and collaborator, Einstürzende Neubauten member Alexander Hacke.

References

1956 births
Living people
American artists
American filmmakers
American rock guitarists